Woodridge is an electoral district of the Legislative Assembly in the Australian state of Queensland.

The district is based in the southern suburbs of Brisbane. It is named for the suburb of Woodridge and also takes in the suburbs of Crestmead, Kingston, Logan Central, Marsden and Slacks Creek. The electorate was first created for the 1977 election.

Woodridge has been held by the Labor Party for all but a few months of its existence, when Mike Kaiser briefly served as an independent after being forced to resign from the party for branch-stacking a decade earlier.  Since the 1980s, it has usually been one of Labor's safest seats.  The only time Labor came close to losing the seat at an election came during Labor's near-wipeout in 2012, in which incumbent Desley Scott saw her majority slashed from a comfortably safe 25.4 percent to a marginal 5.8 percent.  Scott retired ahead of the 2015 election.  Her replacement, former cabinet minister Cameron Dick, reverted the seat to its usual status as a comfortably safe Labor seat, ballooning the Labor majority to 25.9 percent—the safest seat in the entire legislature.

Members for Woodridge

Election results

References

External links
 

Woodridge